or  is a Buddhist Tendai temple in Kyoto. It was established in 984 AD by the monk Kaisan, who was originally from Enryaku-ji. The word gokuraku in its name refers to Sukhāvatī, the Pure Land of the West.

See also
Glossary of Japanese Buddhism
List of National Treasures of Japan (writings)

984 establishments
Buddhist temples in Kyoto
Important Cultural Properties of Japan
10th-century establishments in Japan
Tendai temples
10th-century Buddhist temples